Bill Spiller (October 25, 1913 – 1988) was an American professional golfer who helped to break the color barrier in his sport.

Biography
Spiller was born in Tishomingo, Oklahoma and moved to Tulsa, Oklahoma as a nine-year-old to live with his father where he quickly learned the drawbacks of being a black citizen in America. He was an excellent athlete, a two-sport star in high school. Spiller went on to enroll at Wiley College in Marshall, Texas, and earned an education degree.

He did not take up the sport of golf until he was about 30. Spiller moved to Southern California to try to make a living teaching, but it was not enough to get by, so he worked as a railroad porter. Spiller took up the challenge of a fellow porter in Los Angeles to try golf. He started competing and winning blacks-only amateur golf tournaments during the 1940s.

After being denied entry in the 1948 Richmond Open held in Richmond, California by the PGA of America, Spiller spent many years challenging the segregation policy of the PGA of America. Professional golf at the time was controlled by the PGA of America which required tournaments to give the final say over who could participate. One of its rules was that participants must be Caucasian. A golfer who was otherwise qualified (such as Spiller) could be denied tournament entry for not being Caucasian.

Spiller sued with the assistance of Bay Area attorney Jonathan Rowell. The basis of the lawsuit filed by Spiller and fellow golfer Ted Rhodes was that the golfers were denied a right to earn a living in the sport because the PGA was a closed shop. Under the Taft-Hartley Act such rules were against the law. Shortly before the court date, they withdrew the lawsuit in return for a promise from the PGA lawyer that the PGA would end discrimination. The PGA reneged on its end of the bargain and began sponsoring "invitational tournaments" to which blacks were not invited.

In 1952, the sponsors of the new San Diego Open invited Spiller, unaware of the "Caucasians only" clause. This time he was assisted by fellow invitee and former heavyweight champion Joe Louis. When both men were excluded by president of the PGA of America Horton Smith, Louis took his story to popular newspaper columnist Walter Winchell. The story quickly gained national attention as other newspapers spread the word. Once again, Spiller threatened to sue. Once again, Smith promised to change the rules. This time the PGA of America announced blacks could play, if invited. Some sponsors began inviting blacks, however the segregation clause remained.

In 1960, Spiller's cause came to the attention of California attorney general (and future California Supreme Court justice) Stanley Mosk. Mosk told the PGA of America it would not be allowed to use public courses. At the time, most tournaments were held on public courses. When the PGA of America replied that it would restrict itself to private courses, Mosk promised to stop that as well. Furthermore, he began contacting state attorneys general around the country.

The PGA of America relented in November 1961, removing the clause it had inserted in 1943. It was too late for Spiller to have a successful professional golf career. Spiller had not started until he was almost 30 and the clause wasn't removed until he was 48. However it opened the door for the next generation of players.

In 2009, the PGA of America granted posthumous membership to Spiller, Rhodes, and John Shippen. The PGA also has granted posthumous honorary membership to Joe Louis.

See also

Pete Brown (1935–2015), first African-American to win a PGA-sanctioned tournament in 1964
Lee Elder (1934–2021), first African-American to play in the Masters Tournament in 1975
Charles Owens (1932–2017)
Calvin Peete (1943–2015), most successful African-American on the PGA Tour, with 12 wins, before the emergence of Tiger Woods
Charlie Sifford (1922–2015), first African-American to be member of the PGA Tour in 1961
Tiger Woods (1975–)
United Golf Association

References

American male golfers
African-American golfers
Golfers from California
Wiley College alumni
People from Tishomingo, Oklahoma
1913 births
1988 deaths
20th-century African-American sportspeople